Masamura may refer to:

 (1205–1273), Japanese regent
4614 Masamura, a main-belt asteroid
Masamura Pachinko Museum, a pachinko museum in Nagoya, Japan

See also
Muramasa

Japanese masculine given names